Stephen Blais  (born July 20, 1980) is a Canadian politician who has served as the member of Provincial Parliament (MPP) for Orléans since February 27, 2020, as a member of the Ontario Liberal Party

Before being elected to the Legislative Assembly of Ontario, he was the Ottawa City Councillor for Cumberland Ward. He won the ward in the 2010 Ottawa municipal election, defeating the incumbent Rob Jellett. He was re-elected in the 2014, 2018 municipal elections.

Early life and career
Blais was born in Ottawa and grew up in the Queenswood Heights neighbourhood of Orléans in the former Cumberland Township. Upon graduating from St. Peter Catholic High School, he attended the University of Ottawa to pursue a Bachelor of Social Sciences. Following university, he served as Executive Assistant to Jim Watson while Watson served in the Ontario Cabinet. Blais later moved to Carleton University where he worked as a media and communications advisor.

Prior to being elected as a councillor, Blais served as an Ottawa Catholic School Board Trustee for Orléans-Cumberland. He was first elected as a Trustee in 2006 when he defeated the incumbent.

Political career

Ottawa City Council 
In 2010, Blais was elected the third Ottawa City Councillor for Cumberland Ward defeating the two-term incumbent. He quickly made his mark securing early victories by having the City of Ottawa conduct an environmental assessment to widen HWY 174 and to extend Light Rail Transit to Orléans.

In addition to his focus on reducing commute times through investments in roads and transit, Blais prioritized local park construction. In his first term of office, seven new parks were built in Cumberland Ward and Blais announced a plan to partner with the local homebuilding industry to complete an $8 million expansion of Millennium Park.

Blais was named Chair of the City of Ottawa Transit Commission on December 10, 2014. The Transit Commission is the body charged with oversight of the City's public transit provider OC Transpo.

The Transit Commission is responsible for ensuring the development of a safe, efficient, accessible, and client-focused transit system and for providing overall guidance and direction to the Transit Services Department on all issues relating to the operation of public transit, including the O-Train and Para Transpo. The Transit Commission consists of eight members of Council and four citizen members, as approved by Council. The Transit Commission meets on a monthly basis in a public forum.

Provincial politics 
In October 2019, Blais announced that he would be seeking the Liberal nomination for the provincial riding of Orléans, which had been left vacant when Marie-France Lalonde stepped down to run for the federal Liberal Party. He won the nomination on November 9. Blais won the February 27 by-election with 55 per cent of the vote, defeating his nearest rival, Progressive Conservative candidate Natalie Montgomery, by more than 8,000 votes. This is the largest majority in Orléans in more than 30 years.

Blais serves as the Ontario Liberal critic for several areas:

 Municipal Affairs and Housing
 Transportation and Infrastructure
 Government and Consumer Services
 Indigenous Relations and Reconciliation

He was re-elected in the 2022 Ontario general election.

Personal life 
Blais and his wife Marta have one son, Stephen Jr. They live in the Chaperal neighbourhood.

Election results

Provincial

Municipal

References

Living people
Ottawa city councillors
Canadian Roman Catholics
1980 births
Ontario school board trustees
Ontario Liberal Party MPPs
Franco-Ontarian people
University of Ottawa alumni